"Victor Should Have Been a Jazz Musician" is a 1987 single by Grace Jones.

Background
The song was the third European single from Grace Jones' 1986 album Inside Story, co-produced by Jones and Nile Rodgers. It was released simultaneously with "Crush", which promoted Inside Story in North America. The horns on the track were played by Lenny Pickett, Stan Harrison, Steve Elson, and Mac Gollehon under the collective name The Borneo Horns.

The 12" single featured remixes of "Victor Should Have Been a Jazz Musician" as well as "I'm Not Perfect (But I'm Perfect for You)" by Ben Liebrand, all of which remain unreleased on CD.

Track listing
7" single
A. "Victor Should Have Been a Jazz Musician" – 4:42
B. "Crush" – 3:27

12" single
A. "Victor Should Have Been a Jazz Musician" (The JAZZclubmillionminutemix) – 6:58
B. "I'm Not Perfect (But I'm Perfect for You)" (The C + V.I. Minimix) – 6:49

Chart performance

References

Songs about musicians
Songs about jazz
1987 singles
Grace Jones songs
Song recordings produced by Nile Rodgers
Songs written by Bruce Woolley
Songs written by Grace Jones
1986 songs
Manhattan Records singles
Pop ballads
1980s ballads